Des Simplicius Simplicissimus Jugend is a German-language opera by Karl Amadeus Hartmann to a libretto by Hermann Scherchen, Wolfgang Petzet and the composer after Jakob von Grimmelhausen's picaresque novel Simplicius Simplicissimus. The opera was written 1934-1935 structured in three acts and more scenes, to which was added in 1939 an overture in homage to Prokofiev, and premiered in 1948. It was extensively revised as Simplicius Simplicissimus in 1957.

The title role of the Simplicius, a naive shepherd boy is sung by a soprano, the Einsiedler is sung by a baritone.

Recordings
1957 revised version, Helen Donath, Eberhard Büchner, König, Brinkmann, Scholze, Symphonieorchester des Bayerischen Rundfunks, Heinz Fricke 1985 Wergo
1935 original version, Claudia Mahnke, Frank van Aken, Heinz Göhrig, Staatsorchester Stuttgart, conducted by Kwamé Ryan ArtHaus DVD 2008. 
1948 version, Camilla Nylund, Christian Gerhaher, Will Hartmann, Michael Volle, Die Singphoniker, RO München, Ulf Schirmer BR-Klassik 2008
1957 revised version, Juliane Banse, Peter Marsch, Will Hartmann, Netherlands Radio Choir, Netherlands Philharmonic Orchestra, Markus Stenz Challenge Classics 2013

References

Compositions by Karl Amadeus Hartmann
1935 operas
German-language operas
Operas